The Makemakes are an Austrian pop rock band, comprising Dominic "Dodo" Muhrer, Markus Christ and Florian Meindl. They represented Austria in the Eurovision Song Contest 2015 with the song "I Am Yours".

Career

2012–2014: Early beginnings
On 15 June 2012, The Makemakes released their debut single "The Lovercall". The song peaked at number 6 on the Austrian Singles Chart. On 15 April 2014, they released the single "Million Euro Smile". The song peaked at number 2 on the Austrian Singles Chart.

2015: Eurovision Song Contest and The Makemakes

On 13 March 2015, The Makemakes were chosen to represent Austria in the Eurovision Song Contest 2015 with the song "I Am Yours". The song was selected through a national final organised by the Austrian broadcaster Österreichischer Rundfunk (ORF). Austria was automatically qualified to compete in the finals on 23 May 2015, due to its win the previous year. They tied with Germany for last place with a score of zero, becoming the first representatives of a host nation to fail to score a single point, since 1957. However, the band took their Eurovision loss in good spirits, making the repeated joke "We are the zeroes of our time!" (in reference to a lyric from the winning song, "Heroes"). The band released their debut studio album The Makemakes on 12 May 2015.

2018–present
In March 2018, The Makemakes released a new single "Keep On Moving" in Austria. In January 2019, the band released the single "Freedom" in Austria. In July 2019, the band released the single "The Beach". The song peaked at number 21 on the Scottish Singles Chart and number 60 on the UK Singles Downloads Chart.

Discography

Albums

Singles

Promotional singles

References

External links

Eurovision Song Contest entrants for Austria
Eurovision Song Contest entrants of 2015
Musical groups established in 2012
Austrian pop rock music groups
Austrian pop music groups
2012 establishments in Austria